Walter S. Walker (March 12, 1860 - February 28, 1922) was a Major League Baseball player. Walker played for Detroit Wolverines in the 1884 season. He played just one game in his career, having one hit in four at-bats, with one run scored.

He was born in Berlin Center, Michigan and died in Pontiac, Michigan

External links

Detroit Wolverines players
1860 births
1922 deaths
19th-century baseball players
Minneapolis Millers (baseball) players
Oswego Starchboxes players